Radziszewo  is a village in the administrative district of Gmina Pozezdrze, within the Węgorzewo County in Warmian-Masurian Voivodeship (province) situated in northern Poland.

The village has a population of 210.

References

Radziszewo